Zhu Jiabao (1860 – September 5, 1923) was a Chinese monarchist politician who supported the creation of the Empire of China and the 1917 Manchu Restoration of Zhang Xun. He was born in Ningzhou Town, Huaning County, Yunnan. In 1907, he was appointed Governor of Jilin Province and the next year, he became Governor of Anhui Province, a post he held until the Xinhai Revolution.

References
To the new summer . Northern warlords history books next . Nankai University Press . 2000. .
Xu Youchun editor of the Republican People zo dictionary revised edition . Hebei People's Publishing House . 2007. .
Liushou Lin compiled Republic of China Official chronology . Zhonghua . 1995. .

1860 births
1923 deaths
Republic of China politicians from Yunnan
Governors of Jilin
Governors of Anhui
Qing dynasty politicians from Yunnan
People from Yuxi
Empire of China (1915–1916)